Stephen Elliott Fienberg (27 November 1942 – 14 December 2016) was a Professor Emeritus (formerly the Maurice Falk University Professor of Statistics and Social Science) in the Department of Statistics, the Machine Learning Department, Heinz College, and Cylab at Carnegie Mellon University.
Fienberg was the founding co-editor of the Annual Review of Statistics and Its Application and of the Journal of Privacy and Confidentiality.

Early life and education
Born in Toronto, Ontario, Fienberg earned a Bachelor of Science degree in Mathematics and Statistics from the University of Toronto in 1964, a Master of Arts degree in Statistics in 1965, and a Ph.D. in Statistics in 1968 from Harvard University for research supervised by Frederick Mosteller.

Career and research
Fienberg was on the Carnegie Mellon University faculty from 1980 and served as Dean of the Dietrich College of Humanities and Social Sciences.   He became a U.S. citizen in 1998.

Fienberg was one of the foremost social statisticians in the world, and was well known for his work in log-linear modeling for categorical data, the statistical analysis of network data, and methodology for disclosure limitation. 
He was also an expert on forensic science, the only statistician to serve on the National Commission on Forensic Science.

He authored more than 400 publications, including six books, advised more than 30 Ph.D. students, and could claim more than 105 descendants in his mathematical genealogy.
His publications included books on categorical data analysis,
US census adjustment, and forensic science.
 
He was a founder and editor-in-chief of the Journal of Privacy and Confidentiality. and of the Annual Review of Statistics and Its Application.

Awards and honors
Fienberg was 
an elected member of the National Academy of Sciences,
an elected fellow of the Royal Society of Canada, 
an elected fellow of the American Academy of Arts and Sciences, 
a fellow of the American Association for the Advancement of Science, 
a fellow of the American Statistical Association 
and a fellow of the Institute of Mathematical Statistics. 

He was a recipient of the Committee of Presidents of Statistical Societies (COPSS)  Presidents' Award in 1982. 
In 2002, Fienberg received the  Samuel S. Wilks Award from the American Statistical Association for his distinguished career in statistics.
He received the inaugural Statistical Society of Canada's Lise Manchester Award in 2008 in recognition of his application of statistics to problems of public interest. 
In 2015, he received the Jerome Sacks Award for Cross-Disciplinary Research from the National Institute of Statistical Sciences, 
and the  R. A. Fisher Lectureship from COPSS in 2015.
He was awarded the  Zellner Medal by the International Society for Bayesian Analysis (ISBA) in  2016.

Selected publications
 Bishop, Y. M. M., Fienberg, S. E. and Holland, P. W. (1975). Discrete Multivariate Analysis: Theory and Practice. M.I.T. Press, Cambridge, MA. Paperback edition (1977). A Citation Classic. Reprinted, by Springer-Verlag, New York (2007).
 Fienberg, S. E. and Hinkley, D. V., eds. (1980). R. A. Fisher: An Appreciation. Springer-Verlag, NY. 1st reprint 1989; 2nd reprint by Springer-Verlag, NY (2012).
 Fienberg, S. E. (1980). The Analysis of Cross-classified Categorical Data. 2nd Edition. M.I.T. Press, Cambridge, MA. A Citation Classic. Reprinted, by Springer-Verlag, New York (2007).
 DeGroot, M. H., Fienberg, S. E., and Kadane, J. B., eds. (1986). Statistics and the Law. Wiley, New York.  Wiley Classics Paperback edition (1994).
 Goldenberg, A., Zheng, A. X., Fienberg, S. E. and Airoldi, E. M. (2010) A Survey of Statistical Network Models. Now Publishers Inc.

Personal life
Stephen Fienberg was married to Joyce Fienberg and had two sons, Anthony and Howard, and six grandchildren.  He died on 14 December 2016. 
Joyce Fienberg died on 27 October 2018. She was one of eleven worshippers murdered during the Pittsburgh synagogue shooting at the Tree of Life – Or L'Simcha synagogue in the Squirrel Hill neighborhood of Pittsburgh, Pennsylvania.

References

1942 births
2016 deaths
20th-century American mathematicians
21st-century American mathematicians
American social scientists
American statisticians
Fienberg, Stephen
Carnegie Mellon University faculty
Fellows of the American Academy of Arts and Sciences
Fellows of the American Association for the Advancement of Science
Fellows of the American Statistical Association
Fellows of the Institute of Mathematical Statistics
Fellows of the Royal Society of Canada
Harvard Graduate School of Arts and Sciences alumni
Members of the United States National Academy of Sciences
Scientists from Toronto
Presidents of the Institute of Mathematical Statistics
Survey methodologists
Annual Reviews (publisher) editors
Mathematical statisticians